Altes Lager (German for "Old Camp") is a site  south of the village of Menzlin near Anklam, Western Pomerania, Germany. The site, on the banks of the river Peene, was an important Viking trading-post during the Viking Age. At that time, Pomerania was inhabited by Slavic Wends, yet several Viking trading-posts were set up along the coast (the nearest were Ralswiek to the West and Jomsborg/Wollin to the east).

The settlement covered an area of approximately 18 hectares in the 9th century. Remnants of a bridge and a cemetery have been excavated. Some artifacts found in the graves originated in Ireland and in the lands east of the Baltic. Following Scandinavian customs, the dead were buried either in stone ships, i.e. ship-like graves, or within stone circles. The graves excavated so far have been found to be the tombs of women. Most findings date back to the 9th and 10th centuries.

Name 
The ancient name of the site is unknown. Altes Lager, the current name, dates back to  Friedrich Wilhelm I of Brandenburg's 1676 siege of Anklam.

Sources 
 J. Hermann (Hrsg): Archäologie in der Deutschen Demokratischen Republik. Stuttgart 1989
 Ulrich Schoknecht: Menzlin: Ein frühgeschichtlicher Handelsplatz an der Peene. Beiträge zur Ur- und Frühgeschichte der Bezirke Rostock. Schwerin und Neubrandenburg 1977
 H. Keiling: Menzlin, frühstädtisches Zentrum der Slawen mit Niederlassung skandinavischer Händler. In: H.Keiling: Archäologische Freilichtmuseum Groß Raden. Museumskatalog 7, Museum für Ur- und Frühgeschichte Schwerin 1989

References

See also 
Pomerania during the Early Middle Ages

Former populated places in Germany
History of Pomerania
Viking Age populated places